Pinacosterna nachtigali is a species of beetle in the family Cerambycidae. It was described by Harold in 1879. It feeds on Coffea canephora.

Varietas
 Pinacosterna nachtigali var. trimaculata Breuning, 1935
 Pinacosterna nachtigali var. interrupta Breuning, 1935
 Pinacosterna nachtigali var. viridipunctata Breuning, 1935
 Pinacosterna nachtigali var. reducta Breuning, 1935
 Pinacosterna nachtigali var. uniocellata Breuning, 1935
 Pinacosterna nachtigali var. smithi Jordan, 1903
 Pinacosterna nachtigali var. nigra Aurivillius, 1907

References

Sternotomini
Beetles described in 1879